Old Uyghur is a Unicode block containing characters of the Old Uyghur alphabet.

History
The following Unicode-related documents record the purpose and process of defining specific characters in the Old Uyghur block:

References 

Unicode blocks